Thomas L. Brodie, OP (born 1943) is an Irish Dominican priest who worked in academia and has published books on the Christ myth theory. He argues that both Jesus and Paul did not exist as historical figures, and that a proto-version of Luke-Acts was the earliest Gospel, instead of Mark.

Early life 
He was born in Crusheen, County Clare.

Career

Brodie earned his STD at the Pontifical University of St. Thomas Aquinas in Rome in 1988, at the age of 48. He has taught Hebrew Scriptures and New Testament in various institutions across the United States and in South Africa, including the Aquinas Institute of Theology in St. Louis, Missouri.

Brodie has written a number of books about the Bible, with emphases on the Gospel of John, Genesis and the narratives of Elijah and Elisha as the basis and literary model for the Gospels.

Christ mythicism and sanctions 
His 2012 book Beyond the Quest for the Historical Jesus: Memoir of a Discovery endorsed the Christ myth theory that Jesus of Nazareth was not a historical figure, a belief he says he has held since the 1970s.

Following publication of the book, Brodie was forced to quit his teaching job at the Dominican Biblical Institute and was banned from lecturing while his writings were being investigated. The final judgement of the Dominican Order on the matter was published in their periodical Doctrine and Life in May–June 2014.

Criticisms

In 2014, Jeremy Corley wrote a paper in the peer-reviewed journal Irish Theological Quarterly criticizing Brodie's book Beyond the Quest for the Historical Jesus: Memoir of a Discovery. Though Brodie argues the Elijah-Elisha narratives acted as literary models for the Gospels, Corley says many of Brodie's parallels are weak and unconvincing, such as Brodie's attempt to connect 1 Corinthians 15:3-7 with the theophanies in Numbers 11-17. Corley also notes many major discrepancies between the Elijah-Elisha narratives with Jesus' life, including how only Jesus has birth stories, teachings, and a passion narrative of the last week of Jesus' life that encompasses most of the four Gospels. Corley also notes that John the Baptist, rather than Jesus, is a better candidate for influence of the Elijah-Elisha narratives. Though Brodie emphasizes literary parallels between Jesus and Elijah/Elisha as evidence for complete literary invention, Corley argues that Brodie ignores the fact that most other histories and biographies of the time, such as the works of Thucydides and Herodotus, are combinations of history and literary writing by the author and that one category doesn't disinclude the other.

David Litwa has questioned Brodie's method of showing the non-existence of Jesus and Paul by attempting to reconstruct their entire lives with different parts of the Old Testament and in its Septuagint format. Litwa writes, for example, that "Like Bauer, however, Brodie tends to make logical leaps from detailed literary parallels to historical dependence. Bauer’s parallels came from Seneca and Philo. Brodie uses bits and pieces of the Septuagint to reconstruct Jesus’s life; then he asks us to believe that Jesus’s life is actually derived from readings of the Septuagint. The 
parallels are not sloppy but often mind-bending in their complexity. Brodie graphs these parallels in long, maze-like charts" (pg. 31). Litwa further notes that finding literary exaggeration in a story fails to demonstrate its ahistoricity.

Bibliography

 The Quest for the Origin of John's Gospel: A Source-Oriented Approach Oxford University Press, USA (January 14, 1993) 
 The Gospel According to John: A Literary and Theological Commentary Oxford University Press, USA (November 27, 1997) 
 The Crucial Bridge: The Elijah-Elisha Narrative  Michael Glazier (January 1, 2000) 
 Genesis As Dialogue: A Literary, Historical, and Theological Commentary Oxford University Press, USA (August 16, 2001) 
 The Birthing of the New Testament: The Intertextual Development of the New Testament Writings (New Testament Monographs) Sheffield Phoenix Press Ltd (June 6, 2006) 
 Beyond the Quest for the Historical Jesus: Memoir of a Discovery Sheffield Phoenix Press (September 6, 2012)

See also
 Dominicans in Ireland

References

1943 births
Irish Dominicans
Living people
Christ myth theory proponents
Pseudohistorians